Eucosmophyes icelitodes is a moth of the family Tortricidae first described by Edward Meyrick in 1913. It is found in Sri Lanka.

Description
The head is pale ash grey with a dark grey vertex. Male antennae are subserrulate and pale ash grey. The pedipalps are dark grey with a pale ash-grey apex. The thorax is lighter ash grey. The abdomen is dark leaden grey in males and a lighter grey in females. The anal tuft is light ash grey and the venter is white. The forewings are pale ash grey and oblong. The forewing bears a deep blue to ash-grey basal patch. The posterior two thirds of the costa possesses six to seven black oblique marks. The apex of the forewing has a large round black spot. Female moths have a broad black subapical band on the forewing. The forewing cilia are ash grey. The hindwings are a glossy brownish grey, with darker brown to grey dusting. The hindwing cilia are light brownish grey with a darker subbasal band and a white basal line.

References

Moths of Asia
Moths described in 1913